Monte Grande is a city which forms part of the urban agglomeration of Greater Buenos Aires. It is the administrative seat of Esteban Echeverría Partido in Buenos Aires Province, Argentina.
It was founded on April 3, 1889, by a company named Sociedad Coni, Sansisena y Cía., and currently has an area of 22.57 km² and a population of 109,644 inhabitants.

Named for the Pago de Monte Grande founded by a Spanish Empire Conquistador, the town initially grew around tala and ombú forests, to which vineyards and peach trees were later added. The Sociedad Coni, Sansinena y Cía., prominent Avellaneda-area saladero operators, purchased the land from the Fair family in 1889; Governor Máximo Paz signed a bill establishing Monte Grande on April 3 of that year. Among Monte Grande's first significant businesses were kiln opened by Coni & Sansinena, and the Bon Marché market. Esteban Echeverría Partido was established in 1913, with Monte Grande as its county seat. A number of meat packing plants operated here during much of the 20th century, though these eventually closed. A Coca-Cola bottling plant and the Sofía Santamarina Hospital thus became two of the largest employers in the city, which became a bedroom community with a services-oriented economy.

In Monte Grande, there was an oversea telegraphy radio station.

References

External links

Todo Monte Grande 

Esteban Echeverría Partido
Populated places in Buenos Aires Province
Populated places established in 1889
Cities in Argentina
Argentina